The 1974 UNLV Rebels football team was an American football team that represented the University of Nevada, Las Vegas as an independent during the 1974 NCAA Division II football season. In their second year under head coach Ron Meyer, the Rebels won all eleven games in the regular season and were invited to the eight-team Division II playoffs. They advanced to the semifinals (Grantland Rice Bowl), and ended the year with a 12–1 record.

Schedule

NFL Draft

List of UNLV Rebels in the NFL Draft

References

UNLV
UNLV Rebels football seasons
UNLV Rebels football